Sollenau is a railway station serving the town of Sollenau in Lower Austria.

References 

Railway stations in Lower Austria
Austrian Federal Railways